is a railway station located in Tenryū-ku, Hamamatsu, Shizuoka Prefecture, Japan, jointly operated by the private railroad company Enshū Railway and by the third sector Tenryū Hamanako Railroad.

Lines
Nishikajima Station is a terminal station for the Enshū Railway Line and is located 17.8 kilometers from the opposing terminus of the line at Shin-Hamamatsu Station. It is also served by the Tenryū Hamanako Line and is 28.5 kilometers from the starting point of the line at Kakegawa Station.

Station layout
The Enshū Railway side of the station has two ground-level opposed side platforms. The Tenryū Hamanako portion of the station has a single side platform, although it previously had a second side platform which was used primarily for freight services. The platforms are connected by an underground passageway.  The Enshū Railway portion of the station is staffed; however, the Tenryū Hamanako portion of the station is not.

Platforms

Adjacent stations

Station history

In 1943, as part of the wartime nationalization and consolidation of private railways, this line became part of the Enshū Railway Line. On April 1, 1923, the station was renamed , and (after nationalization) on March 1, 1938, was moved approximately 400 meters to the south, and given its present name.

On June 1, 1940, JNR's Futamata Line was extended from Enshū-Mori Station to Kanasashi Station, with an intermediate stop at Nishi-Kashima Station. Scheduled freight services were discontinued from June 1970. After the privatization of JNR on March 15, 1987, the station came under the control of the Tenryū Hamanako Line.

Passenger statistics
In fiscal 2017, the Enshū Railway portion of the station was used by an average of 1,475 passengers daily and the Tenryū Hamanako port of the station was used by 272 passengers daily (boarding passengers only).

Surrounding area
 Ministry of Agriculture, Forestry and Fisheries (Japan) Tenryū Forestry Management office

See also
 List of Railway Stations in Japan

References

External links

 Enshu Railway Official home page
 Tenryū Hamanako Railroad Station information 

Railway stations in Shizuoka Prefecture
Railway stations in Hamamatsu
Railway stations in Japan opened in 1909
Stations of Enshū Railway
Stations of Tenryū Hamanako Railroad